Carmona may refer to:

Places

Angola 
 the former name of the town of Uíge

Costa Rica 
 Carmona District, Nandayure, a district in Guanacaste Province

India 
 Carmona, Goa, a village located in the Salcette district of South Goa, India

Mexico 
 Mexquitic de Carmona, a municipality in San Luis Potosí

Philippines 
 Carmona, Cavite, a component city
 Carmona, Gandara, Samar, a barangay
 Carmona, Makati, a barangay

Spain 
 Carmona, Spain, a town in Andalusia
 Carmona, Cantabria, a village in the municipality of Cabuérniga

United States 
 an unincorporated area in Mercer County, Pennsylvania
 an unincorporated area in Polk County, Texas

People
 Carmona (surname), including a list of people with the surname Carmona

Other
 Carmona (plant), a genus of flowering plants in the family Boraginaceae
 Caños de Carmona, sections of a Roman aqueduct in the city of Seville, Spain